Mokslas skaitymo rašto lietuviško (Old Lithuanian: Moksłas skaityma raszta lietuwiszka) is the first Catholic primer of the Lithuanian language.

The first Lithuanian primer Mokslas skaitymo rašto lenkiško (Old Lithuanian: Moksłas skaytima raszto lękiszko) was published in 1759–1761, however later it was published with a name Mokslas skaitymo rašto lietuviško (Old Lithuanian: Moksłas skaityma raszta lietuwiszka). In 1776–1790, about 1,000 copies of the primer were issued annually, in total – over 15,000 copies. This primer was published until 1864 and was the most important factor in educating the mass audience of readers of the Lithuanian literature.

Gallery

See also
 Catechism of Martynas Mažvydas – the first printed book in the Lithuanian language, printed in 1547
 Postil of Jonas Bretkūnas – collection of sermons and Bible commentaries published in 1591
 Catechism of Mikalojus Daukša – the first Lithuanian Roman Catholic catechism published in 1595
 Catechism of Merkelis Petkevičius – the first Lithuanian Protestant (Calvinist) catechism published in the Grand Duchy of Lithuania in 1598
 Universitas lingvarum Litvaniae – the oldest surviving grammar of the Lithuanian language
 Grammatica Litvanica – the first printed grammar of the Lithuanian language

References

Linguistics books
1759 books
Lithuanian books
Lithuanian grammar
Basal readers
Learning to read
Reading (process)